BNS Sheikh Hasina is a new naval base that has been developed for the Bangladesh Navy. This is the first ever full-fledged submarine base of Bangladesh Navy. Built at a cost of $1.21 billion, the base can accommodate a total of six submarines and eight warships at a time. It will allow for safe and swift movement of the submarines in case of emergency, as the base is located at the Bay of Bengal.

History
On 3 March 2017 Prime Minister Sheikh Hasina laid the foundation stone of a submarine base in Pekua in the coastal city of Cox's Bazar.

References

Bangladesh Navy bases
Military installations of Bangladesh
Shore establishments of the Bangladesh Navy
Sheikh Hasina